Bruno Rodrigues may refer to:
Bruno Alexandre Rodrigues (born 1989), Brazilian former football striker
Bruno Rodrigues (footballer, born 1996), Portuguese football forward
Bruno Rodrigues (footballer, born 1997), Brazilian football forward for São Paulo
Bruno Rodrigues (footballer, born 2001), Portuguese football defender for Braga

See also
Bruno Rodríguez (disambiguation)
Bruno Parente (born 1981), born Bruno Alexandre Parente Rodrigues, Portuguese football defender
Bruno Luiz (born 1984), born Bruno Luiz de Almeida Rodrigues, Brazilian football forward